Abdulkhadir Sheikh Sakhawudeen was a Somali political figure and activist.

History
Abdulkhadir was born to a Tunni family.

He was the first President of the Somali Youth League (SYL), Somalia's first political party. Having also been instrumental as the founder of the organization, Abdulkhadir and other early SYL nationalists were strongly influenced by the religious rebellion at the turn of the century of various religious figures such as Uways al-Barawi, his direct grandfather.

The SYL was established in 1943. Abdulkhadir died in June 1951.

See also
Somali Youth League

References

                   

Ethnic Somali people
Somalian politicians
1951 deaths
Year of birth missing
British Somaliland people of World War II